Eas Mòr is a waterfall in Glen Brittle on the island of Skye in Scotland. It lies on the Allt Coire na Bannachdich in a small gorge east of Glenbrittle House.

See also
Waterfalls of Scotland

References

Landforms of the Isle of Skye
Waterfalls of Highland (council area)